Senkaimis ('old village') is a village in Kėdainiai district municipality, in Kaunas County, in central Lithuania. According to the 2011 census, the village was uninhabited. It is located by the Vilnius-Šiauliai railway.

Demography

References

Villages in Kaunas County
Kėdainiai District Municipality